Jed MacKay is a Canadian children's TV producer/writer/composer. He began his career writing for TVOntario's long-running success Polka Dot Door, for which he was honoured with a Masterworks Award by the Academy of Canadian Cinema & Television in 2010,  and CBC's Homemade Television, winner of the Children's Broadcast Institute prize for Best Children's Show.  MacKay became a producer in 1985. MacKay also composed the original songs for the shows he wrote or created, as well as the themes for Join In!, Polka Dot Shorts, Telefrancais and Elliot Moose. He has written or composed for many other series, and was the Creative Producer and Executive Story Editor for Halifax Film's  Lunar Jim in 2007. MacKay was creative consultant for CBC's game-changing "Canada's Super Speller" (winner of the ACCT's 2010 Gemini Award for Best Children's or Youth Non-Fiction Series). Since 2009 he has developed, and been Creative Producer and Executive Story Editor, of DHX Media's Pirates: Adventures in Art.

Outside his work in children's TV, MacKay was also the Co-ordinating Director for CBC's Just For Laughs TV series from 2000 to 2003, garnering a Gemini win for Sean Cullen and two more Gemini nominations for the series.

Notable works
Toad Patrol (Night Fright, Good Day)

External links

Living people
Canadian television composers
Canadian male screenwriters
Canadian television producers
Year of birth missing (living people)
Place of birth missing (living people)
20th-century Canadian screenwriters
20th-century Canadian male writers
21st-century Canadian screenwriters
21st-century Canadian male writers